Batil Spur (‘Batilov Rid’ \ba-'ti-lov 'rid\) is the rocky ridge extending 3.9 km and 1.3 km wide, forming the southeast extremity of Flowers Hills on the east side of Sentinel Range in Ellsworth Mountains.  It surmounts Rutford Ice Stream to the east and the ends of its tributaries flowing from Sikera Valley and Doyran Heights to the west.

The peak is named after the medieval fortress of Batil in Western Bulgaria.

Location
US mapping in 1961 and 1988.

Maps
 Vinson Massif.  Scale 1:250 000 topographic map.  Reston, Virginia: US Geological Survey, 1988.
 Antarctic Digital Database (ADD). Scale 1:250000 topographic map of Antarctica. Scientific Committee on Antarctic Research (SCAR). Since 1993, regularly updated.

Notes

References
 Batil Spur. SCAR Composite Gazetteer of Antarctica.
 Bulgarian Antarctic Gazetteer. Antarctic Place-names Commission. (details in Bulgarian, basic data in English)

External links
 Batil Spur. Adjusted Copernix satellite image

Ellsworth Mountains
Bulgaria and the Antarctic
Ridges of Ellsworth Land